Birkilane Department is one of the 45 departments of Senegal and is located in the Kaffrine Region. It was created as part of the new region in 2008.

Administrative divisions
The principal settlement is the commune of Birkilane.

The rural districts (communautés rurales) comprise:

 Arrondissement of Keur Mboucki:
 
 
 
 Arrondissement of Maboi:

References

Departments of Senegal
Kaffrine Region